Richard James Northern MBE (born 2 November 1954) is a former British diplomat.

Biography

Born on 2 November 1954, Richard Northern was educated at Bedford School and at Jesus College, Cambridge.  He joined the British Diplomatic Service in 1976 and, following diplomatic postings in Lebanon, Saudi Arabia, Italy and Canada, he served as British Ambassador to Libya between 2010 and 2011, when the British Embassy in Tripoli was closed due to the Libyan Civil War.

In March 2011, A conversation purportedly between Richard Northern and a spokesman for Mustafa Abdul Jalil, the former Libyan Justice Minister who subsequently became Chairman of the rebel National Transitional Council in Benghazi, was intercepted and broadcast on Libyan state television.

Since December 2011 Richard Northern has been a Consultant, advising clients on business in the Middle East and Africa. He contributed a chapter to the book 'The 2011 Libyan Uprisings and the Struggle for the Post-Qadhafi Future' published by Palgrave Macmillan in 2013.

References

1954 births
People educated at Bedford School
Alumni of Jesus College, Cambridge
Ambassadors of the United Kingdom to Libya
Members of HM Diplomatic Service
Living people
Members of the Order of the British Empire
20th-century British diplomats